Coregonus maxillaris is a species of fish belonging to the family Salmonidae.

The species inhabits freshwater environments.

References

maxillaris